Daniel George Bellinger (born September 22, 2000) is an American football tight end for the New York Giants of the National Football League (NFL). He played college football at San Diego State.

Early life and high school
Bellinger grew up in Las Vegas, Nevada and attended Palo Verde High School. In his senior season, Bellinger was named All-Sunset 4A Region at tight end after catching 21 passes for 371 yards and three touchdowns and first-team All-State at linebacker

College career
Bellinger played 59 offensive snaps and caught one pass for ten yards as a true freshman. As a sophomore, he had 15 receptions for 201 yards and three touchdowns. Bellinger caught 21 passes for 203 yards as a junior. As a senior, he caught 31 passes for 357 yards and two touchdowns. At the end of the season, Bellinger received an invitation to play in the Senior Bowl.

Professional career
Bellinger was drafted by the New York Giants with the 112th pick in the fourth round of the 2022 NFL Draft. On July 21, 2022, Bellinger was placed on the physically unable to perform list with a quad injury. On July 27, 2022, Bellinger was activated from PUP list. Bellinger had his first reception against the Carolina Panthers on September 18, 2022, for a game tying touchdown. In Week 7 game against the Jacksonville Jaguars Bellinger got his eye poked by Devin Lloyd which required surgery to repair his septum as well as fractures on the lower part of his left eye socket. He appeared in 12 games, of which he started 11. He finished his rookie season with 30 receptions for 268 yards and two receiving touchdowns to go along with a rushing touchdown.

In the Wild Card Round of the playoffs, Bellinger recorded a receiving touchdown in the 31–24 victory over the Minnesota Vikings.

References

External links
 New York Giants bio
San Diego State Aztecs bio

2000 births
Living people
Players of American football from Nevada
Sportspeople from Las Vegas
American football tight ends
San Diego State Aztecs football players
New York Giants players